James Nelson Brown (December 9, 1926April 14, 1991) was an American politician who served on the Michigan House of Representatives from 1969 to 1972.

Early life 
Brown was born on December 9, 1926, in Mason, Ingham County, Michigan to parents Vernon J. Brown and Maud R. DeCamp.

Military service 

Brown served in the United States Marine Corps during World War II.

Personal life 
Brown married Joan in 1951. Brown was a member of Kiwanis, the American Legion, and Veterans of Foreign Wars. Brown was a Presbyterian.

Career 
In 1968, Brown was delegate to the Republican National Convention. Brown was sworn into office as member of the Michigan House of Representatives from the 59th district and held this office until December 31, 1972. In 1972, Brown ran for United States Representative from Michigan's 6th district, but lost in the primaries.

Death 
Brown died on April 14, 1991. He is interred at Hawley Cemetery in Mason, Ingham County, Michigan.

References 

1926 births
1991 deaths
Central Michigan University alumni
Michigan State University alumni
Republican Party members of the Michigan House of Representatives
Military personnel from Michigan
United States Marine Corps personnel of World War II
20th-century American politicians
Presbyterians from Michigan
20th-century Presbyterians
People from Mason, Michigan
Burials in Michigan